Brian Williams (born 5 November 1955) is a former professional footballer who played in a total of 591 games for six different clubs in The Football League during an eighteen-year career spanning the period from 1973 to 1991.

Williams, who was originally from Salford, started his career as an apprentice with one of his local sides, Bury, turning professional with them in 1973. He went on to make 159 league appearances with the Lancashire club, and scored 19 goals before leaving to join Queens Park Rangers for a single season in 1977. He began a nine-year spell in the West Country in 1978, spending three years with Swindon Town, four years with Bristol Rovers, and two with Bristol City, becoming one of the few players to represent both sides in Bristol derbies in the process. His transfer from Swindon to Bristol Rovers was a swap deal, with midfielder Gary Emmanuel moving in the opposite direction. Whilst at Swindon Brian was fondly known as "Animal".

His final League club was Shrewsbury Town, who he represented between 1987 and 1991. He then joined non-League side Alvechurch, just two years before they folded in 1993.

References

1955 births
Living people
Footballers from Salford
English footballers
Association football midfielders
Association football defenders
English Football League players
Bury F.C. players
Queens Park Rangers F.C. players
Swindon Town F.C. players
Bristol Rovers F.C. players
Bristol City F.C. players
Shrewsbury Town F.C. players
Alvechurch F.C. players